Contactin 1, also known as CNTN1, is a protein which in humans is encoded by the CNTN1 gene.

Function 

The protein encoded by this gene is a member of the immunoglobulin superfamily. It is a glycosylphosphatidylinositol (GPI)-anchored neuronal membrane protein that functions as a cell adhesion molecule. It may play a role in the formation of axon connections in the developing nervous system. Two alternatively spliced transcript variants encoding different isoforms have been described for this gene.

Interactions 

CNTN1 has been shown to interact with PTPRB.

References

External links

Further reading